Barium fluoride is an inorganic compound with the formula . It is a colorless solid that occurs in nature as the rare mineral frankdicksonite. Under standard conditions it adopts the fluorite structure and at high pressure the  structure. Like , it is resilient to and insoluble in water.

Above ca. 500 °C,  is corroded by moisture, but in dry environments it can be used up to 800 °C. Prolonged exposure to moisture degrades transmission in the vacuum UV range. It is less resistant to water than calcium fluoride, but it is the most resistant of all the optical fluorides to high-energy radiation, though its far ultraviolet transmittance is lower than that of the other fluorides. It is quite hard, very sensitive to thermal shock and fractures quite easily.

Optical properties
Barium fluoride is transparent from the ultraviolet to the infrared, from 150 to 200 nm to 11–11.5 µm. It is used in windows for infrared spectroscopy, in particular in the field of fuel oil analysis. Its transmittance at 200 nm is relatively low (0.60), but at 500 nm it goes up to 0.96–0.97 and stays at that level until 9 µm, then it starts falling off (0.85 for 10 µm and 0.42 for 12 µm). The refractive index is about 1.46 from 700 nm to 5 µm.

Barium fluoride is also a common, very fast (one of the fastest) scintillators for the detection of X-rays, gamma rays or other high energy particles. One of its applications is the detection of 511 keV gamma photons in positron emission tomography. It responds also to alpha and beta particles, but, unlike most scintillators, it does not emit ultraviolet light. It can be also used for detection of high-energy (10–150 MeV) neutrons, using pulse shape discrimination techniques to separate them from simultaneously occurring gamma photons.

Barium fluoride is used as a preopacifying agent and in enamel and glazing frits production. Its other use is in the production of welding agents (an additive to some fluxes, a component of coatings for welding rods and in welding powders). It is also used in metallurgy, as a molten bath for refining aluminium.

Gas phase structure
In the vapor phase the  molecule is non-linear with an F-Ba-F angle of approximately 108°. Its nonlinearity violates VSEPR theory. Ab initio calculations indicate that contributions from d orbitals in the shell below the valence shell are responsible. Another proposal is that polarisation of the electron core of the barium atom creates an approximately tetrahedral distribution of charge that interacts with the Ba-F bonds.

References

Cited sources

External links
MSDS at Oxford University 

Barium compounds
Fluorides
Optical materials
Phosphors and scintillators
Crystals
Alkaline earth metal halides
Fluorite crystal structure

ar:فلوريد باريوم
de:Bariumfluorid
it:Fluoruro di bario
nl:Bariumfluoride
pl:Fluorek baru
ru:Фторид бария
zh:氟化钡